Sts. Sergius and Herman of Valaam Chapel is a historic Russian Orthodox chapel in Ouzinkie, Alaska. The chapel is named for the Saints Sergius and Herman of Valaam. It was built in 1898 by Bishop Tikhon, who located it over the grave of Father Herman, the first Russian Orthodox clergyman to be canonized for service in Alaska, and who has been considered the patron saint of Alaska. An altar section and a vestibule section were added later, completing out a customary three-section design of Russian Orthodox churches in Alaska.

The building was added to the National Register of Historic Places in 1980.

See also
Sts. Sergius and Herman of Valaam Church, in English Bay, Alaska, also NRHP-listed
National Register of Historic Places listings in Kodiak Island Borough, Alaska

References

Notes

Churches completed in 1898
Russian Orthodox church buildings in Alaska
Churches on the National Register of Historic Places in Alaska
Buildings and structures in Kodiak Island Borough, Alaska
1898 establishments in Alaska
Buildings and structures on the National Register of Historic Places in Kodiak Island Borough, Alaska
Chapels in the United States
Russian Orthodox chapels